Percha is a comune (municipality) in South Tyrol in northern Italy, located about  northeast of Bolzano. This Percha is not to be confused with Percha of the Federal Republic of Germany.

Geography

Percha borders the following municipalities: Bruneck, Sand in Taufers, Gais and Rasen-Antholz.

Frazioni
The municipality of Percha contains the frazioni (subdivisions, mainly villages and hamlets) Aschbach, Wielenberg (Sopranessano), Nasen (Nessano), Litschbach (Rio Liccio), Platten (Plata Montevila), Oberwielenbach (Vila di Sopra), and Unterwielenbach (Vila di Sotto).

History

Coat-of-arms
The shield is party per fess of argent and gules; a deer horn with six points is represented in the upper part, a sable plow in the lower. The deer horn symbolizes the hunting and the woods, the six points are the six villages in the municipality; the plow represents the agriculture practiced in the territory. The coat of arms was granted in 1967.

Society

Linguistic distribution
According to the 2011 census, 94.86% of the population speak German, 4.29% Italian and 0.84% Ladin as first language.

Demographic evolution

References

External links

 Homepage of the municipality

Municipalities of South Tyrol
Rieserferner-Ahrn Nature Park